The Karancs Hills are a range of hills on the Hungarian-Slovakian border.

References

Mountain ranges of Hungary
Mountain ranges of the Western Carpathians